Mujo Ulqinaku (born Mujo Cakuli; 1896 – 7 April 1939) was an Albanian sergeant of the Royal Albanian Navy, known for his resistance on 7 April 1939 to the Italian forces during the Italian invasion of Albania. He was given the People's Hero of Albania award posthumously.

Life
Mujo Ulqinaku was born in 1896 in Ulcinj, in the Principality of Montenegro, now modern Montenegro, to a family of sailors and fishermen. In his teens he joined the commercial fleet in Shkodër and Lezhë. Later he served in the Albanian navy, based in Durrës, with the rank of sergeant, commanding the patrol boat Tiranë. He was one of the few officers of the  Royal Albanian Army who tried to stop the Italian invasion of Albania. Armed only with a machine gun, he was placed in the center of the defense line where he killed and wounded dozens of Italian soldiers. He was killed by an artillery shell from an Italian warship in the last hour of the battle.

Legacy

Ulqinaku is memorialized by a monument in front of Durrës Castle. A grammar school in Durrës and streets in Tirana and Prishtina bear his name. A documentary on his life and actions, "", was released in 1979 by Kinostudio Shqipëria e Re.

References

20th-century Albanian military personnel
1896 births
1939 deaths
Heroes of Albania
People from Ulcinj
Albanians in Montenegro
Military personnel killed in action